The UTS-UC Hawks Handball Club is a handball club. It's a joint venture of the UTS Handball Club from the University of Technology Sydney and University of Canberra from Sydney and Canberra, Australia. The team's best result in Handball League Australia is second.

Records

Men
 Oceania Handball Champions Cup
Second 2017
 Handball League Australia
Second - 2016
Third - 2017

References

External links
Official webpage

Handball League Australia
University of Technology Sydney
University of Canberra
Sporting clubs in Sydney
Sporting clubs in Canberra
Australian handball clubs
University and college sports clubs in Australia
2016 establishments in Australia
Handball clubs established in 2016